Ibrahim Touré (born 1 January 1995) is a Dutch-Guinean professional footballer who plays as a attacking midfielder for SteDoCo.

Career

SteDoCo
In September 2019, Touré joined Dutch Derde Divisie club SteDoCo.

References

External links
 

1995 births
Living people
Dutch footballers
FC Dordrecht players
SC Cambuur players
TOP Oss players
Eredivisie players
Eerste Divisie players
Derde Divisie players
Association football midfielders
Sportspeople from Conakry